Benjamin Brown (January 14, 1890 – December 11, 1974) was an architect in Toronto. He was born in what is now Lithuania and arrived in Toronto around 1896 with his family.

Education
Brown attended York Street Public School for a brief time quitting school in 1895 to work in the garment factory to help out his family. In the early 1900s he enrolled in the Ontario School of Art and Design intending to become an artist. When art proved to be a financially unfeasible profession, Brown decided to switch to architecture. Thus, after completing the equivalent of high school, he enrolled in the University of Toronto architectural program graduating in 1913.

Career
Soon after graduation, Brown opened up a practice with fellow architect Arthur W. McConnell, which lasted until the early 1920s. After the partnership ended, Brown set up an independent practice.

Brown was among the first Jewish architects to practice in Toronto during the early 20th century. The discriminatory atmosphere in Toronto in the 1920s was such that it was difficult for Jewish professionals to attract clientele. Thus, Brown's early commissions came primarily from members of the Jewish community. In Toronto's Fashion District, many Jewish clients in the clothing trade commissioned him to design functional loft buildings constructed of reinforced concrete and dressed in a stylish Art Deco cladding of cut stone and brick.

Brown designed and built over 200 projects including single-family residences, apartment buildings, commercial and industrial buildings, as well as synagogues and other community buildings. Many of Brown's buildings were designed in the Art Deco style, with some containing Georgian, Craftsman, Colonial Revival, Tudor and Romanesque elements.

Brown retired in 1955.

Legacy
The Ontario Jewish Archives houses Brown's life's work of over 1500 architectural drawings as a resource for the social history of Toronto's Jewish community as well as the architectural history of the city.

Buildings

References

External

1890 births
1974 deaths
Canadian architects
People from Old Toronto